Penix is a Cornish-language family name (Cornish surnames) originating in Cornwall.  In medieval times, people were known by their given names, but as the population grew, surnames were added based on the place that they owned or lived in to distinguish people from one another.  While Celtic people tended to use patronymic names, many Cornish people used local place names as surnames, sometimes in addition to patronymics.

The name Penix could be derived from a local place name, the family lived in the parish of Saint Pinnock, in Cornwall.  Surnames are spelled in many ways, due to lack of spelling rules.  Therefore, the name has been spelled Pinoke, Pinnick, Pinnock, Pincock and Pinock in addition to other variations of the name. The word "Pen" in Cornish means "head" or "end".

People named Penix
Amanda Penix, winner of Miss Oklahoma Teen USA 1997 and Miss Oklahoma USA 2000
Michael Penix Jr. (born 2000), American football player
Kevin Penix, state legislator in Arkansas

See also

 Fenix
 Phenix
 Phoenix

References

Cornish-language surnames